Cannock Town F.C. was an English association football club based in Cannock, Staffordshire. Cannock Town commenced competitive league football in the Walsall & District League in 1892-93 and entered the FA Cup for the first time in the 1908–09 season and reached the second qualifying round before being knocked out by Hednesford Town. In 1921, Cannock Town joined the Birmingham & District League, but left seven years later after finishing in the bottom half of the table every season. In 1933 the club returned to the league, but Cannock Town folded during the 1936–37 campaign and were forced to resign from the league, and their results expunged from the records. This was also the last season in which the side entered the FA Cup, where they lost 6–1 to Wellington Town in the preliminary round.

An unrelated club with the same name competed in the Staffordshire Senior Football League in the 1993–94 season.

In 2012 a club of the same name opened as a youth football club.

References

External links
Cannock Town at the Football Club History Database
FA Cup results archive at TheFA.com

Defunct football clubs in England
Defunct football clubs in Staffordshire
Association football clubs disestablished in 1937
1937 disestablishments in England
Cannock
Association football clubs established in 1908